"Death and taxes" is a phrase commonly referencing a famous quotation written by American statesman Benjamin Franklin: 

Though Franklin is not the progenitor of the phrase, his usage is the most famous, especially in the United States. Earlier versions from the 18th century include a line in Daniel Defoe's The Political History of the Devil (1726), and a quote from The Cobbler of Preston by Christopher Bullock (1716), which is the earliest known iteration.

See also
Irreversible binomial, a pair or group of words used together in fixed order

References

English-language idioms